Sameer Satesh Patel (born 16 June 1976) is a former English cricketer.  Patel was a right-handed batsman who bowled right-arm off break.  He was born at Reading, Berkshire.

Patel made his debut for Berkshire in the 1996 Minor Counties Championship against Cornwall.  From 1996 to 2004, he represented the county in 27 Minor Counties Championships matches, with his final appearance for the county in that competition coming against Herefordshire.  He also represented Berkshire in 23 MCCA Knockout Trophy matches, the last of which came against Dorset in 2006.

Patel also represented the county in List-A matches, making his List-A debut against the Warwickshire Cricket Board in the 1999 NatWest Trophy.  From 1999 to 2005, he represented the county in 6 List-A matches, with his final match in that format coming against Gloucestershire in the 2005 Cheltenham & Gloucester Trophy.  In his 6 List-A matches, he scored 104 runs at a batting average of 14.85, with a single half century high score of 53*.  With the ball he took 7 wickets at a bowling average of 36.71, with best figures of 2/28.

References

External links
Sameer Patel at Cricinfo
Sameer Patel at CricketArchive

1976 births
Living people
Sportspeople from Reading, Berkshire
English cricketers
Berkshire cricketers
British sportspeople of Indian descent
British Asian cricketers